CBU-FM is a Canadian radio station, which broadcasts the programming of the CBC Music network in Vancouver, British Columbia. The station broadcasts at 105.7 FM. CBU-FM's transmitter is located atop Mount Seymour.

The station was originally launched on December 12, 1947 as an FM simulcast of the CBC AM station CBR. It was rebranded as CBU-FM in 1952 when the Vancouver AM station was renamed.

It was not part of the CBC's original FM network in 1960, but became part of the 1964 relaunch.

The station operates from the CBC Regional Broadcast Centre at 700 Hamilton Street in Downtown Vancouver. As with most CBC Music stations, presently there is no Vancouver-specific programming on the station apart from short weather updates. However, Saturday Afternoon at the Opera and In Concert, both hosted by Bill Richardson, currently originate from Vancouver.

Rebroadcasters

Community-owned rebroadcasters

Territories

CBU-FM-8 Whitehorse was originally known as CFWH-FM until 2009. CBNY-FM was known as CFYK-FM until June 3, 2013.

External links
 

BU-FM
BU-FM
Radio stations established in 1947
1947 establishments in British Columbia